Dima is a genus of beetles belonging to the family Elateridae.

Synonym:
 Celox Schaufuss, 1862

Species:
 Dima dalmatina
 Dima dima
 Dima elateroides

References

Elateridae
Elateridae genera